In mathematics, elliptic cohomology is a cohomology theory in the sense of algebraic topology. It is related to elliptic curves and modular forms.

History and motivation
Historically, elliptic cohomology arose from the study of elliptic genera. It was known by Atiyah and Hirzebruch that if  acts smoothly and non-trivially on a spin manifold, then the index of the Dirac operator vanishes. In 1983, Witten conjectured that in this situation the equivariant index of a certain twisted Dirac operator is at least constant. This led to certain other problems concerning -actions on manifolds, which could be solved by Ochanine by the introduction of elliptic genera. In turn, Witten related these to (conjectural) index theory on free loop spaces. Elliptic cohomology, invented in its original form by Landweber, Stong and Ravenel in the late 1980s, was introduced to clarify certain issues with elliptic genera and provide a context for (conjectural) index theory of families of differential operators on free loop spaces. In some sense it can be seen as an approximation to the K-theory of the free loop space.

Definitions and constructions
Call a cohomology theory  even periodic if  for i odd and there is an invertible element . These theories possess a complex orientation, which gives a formal group law. A particularly rich source for formal group laws are elliptic curves. A cohomology theory  with

The usual construction of such elliptic cohomology theories uses the Landweber exact functor theorem.

 

Franke has identified the condition needed to fulfill Landweber exactness:

  needs to be flat over 

These conditions can be checked in many cases related to elliptic genera. Moreover, the conditions are fulfilled in the universal case in the sense that the map from the moduli stack of elliptic curves to the moduli stack of formal groups

is flat. This gives then a presheaf of cohomology theoriesover the site of affine schemes flat over the moduli stack of elliptic curves. The desire to get a universal elliptic cohomology theory by taking global sections has led to the construction of the topological modular formspg 20as the homotopy limit of this presheaf over the previous site.

See also 

 Spectral algebraic geometry
 Intermediate Jacobian
 Chromatic homotopy theory

References

.
.
.
.
.

Founding articles 

 Elliptic cohomology - Graeme Segal

Extensions to Calabi-Yau manifolds 

 K3 Spectra
 Constructing explicit K3 spectra
 The Elliptic curves in gauge theory, string theory, and cohomology

Cohomology theories
Elliptic curves
Modular forms